The 1953 DFB-Pokal Final decided the winner of the 1952–53 DFB-Pokal, the 10th season of Germany's knockout football cup competition. It was played on 1 May 1953 at the Rheinstadion in Düsseldorf. Rot-Weiss Essen won the match 2–1 against Alemannia Aachen, to claim their 1st cup title.

Route to the final
The DFB-Pokal began with 32 teams in a single-elimination knockout cup competition. There were a total of four rounds leading up to the final. Teams were drawn against each other, and the winner after 90 minutes would advance. If still tied, 30 minutes of extra time was played. If the score was still level, a replay would take place at the original away team's stadium. If still level after 90 minutes, 30 minutes of extra time was played. If the score was still level, a drawing of lots would decide who would advance to the next round.

Note: In all results below, the score of the finalist is given first (H: home; A: away; N: neutral).

Match

Details

References

External links
 Match report at kicker.de 
 Match report at WorldFootball.net
 Match report at Fussballdaten.de 

Rot-Weiss Essen matches
Alemannia Aachen matches
1952–53 in German football cups
1953
Sports competitions in Düsseldorf
20th century in Düsseldorf
May 1953 sports events in Europe